is a Japanese weightlifter. She competed at the 2012 Summer Olympics in the Women's 53 kg, finishing 13th. At the 2016 Summer Olympics, in the same weight category, she finished top of Group B and 6th overall.

She won at the 2013 Summer Universiade in the Women's 53 kg.

References

External links
 

Living people
Olympic weightlifters of Japan
Weightlifters at the 2012 Summer Olympics
Weightlifters at the 2016 Summer Olympics
Weightlifters at the 2020 Summer Olympics
Weightlifters at the 2014 Asian Games
Japanese female weightlifters
1992 births
Universiade medalists in weightlifting
Weightlifters at the 2018 Asian Games
Universiade gold medalists for Japan
Asian Games competitors for Japan
Medalists at the 2013 Summer Universiade
20th-century Japanese women
21st-century Japanese women